Kathryn L. Shaw is the Ernest C. Arbuckle Professor of Economics at the Graduate School of Business, Stanford University. Previously, she was the Ford Distinguished Research Chair and Professor of Economics at Tepper School of Business, Carnegie Mellon University. From 1999-2001, she served as a Senate-confirmed Member of President Bill Clinton's Council of Economic Advisers.

Education
Shaw graduated from Occidental College in 1976, and completed her PhD in economics at Harvard University in 1981.

Research
Shaw is the co-developer of the field of "insider econometrics," a research field within personnel economics in which researchers go within companies and use insider knowledge and data to identify the performance gains from management practices. In early work, she (and her co-authors) use production-level data from firms in the steel industry to model the effects of alternative management strategies on productivity. Recently, she has turned to studying the performance gains from new information technologies and the changes in management strategy towards product customization that enhance returns to investment. In related work on incentives in franchising, she shows how the optimal use of franchise contracts can increase brand value for franchise companies. In recent work, Shaw and her co-authors have discovered that a good boss can significantly increase the output of subordinates. This kind of promotion will continue into the future. Shaw also finds that serial entrepreneurs carry intangible capital with them when moving to a new more productive company. Her research has been extensively funded by the National Science Foundation (NSF), the Alfred P. Sloan Foundation, the Russell Sage and Rockefeller Foundations, and the Department of Labor, and has been published in the American Economic Review, as well as Management Science, among other publications.

Recognition
In 1998, Shaw was the recipient of the Minnesota Award for Employment Research for the best paper in 1997-98 on the topic of employment issues. In 2001, she received the Columbia University award for the best paper on international business. From 1999-2001, Shaw’s expertise in labor economics was recognised by an appointment as a Senate-Confirmed member of Clinton’s Council of Economic Advisors. At Carnegie Mellon University, Shaw received the Award for Sustained Teaching Excellence, the Economics Department Teaching Award, was Chair of the Faculty Senate, and was Head of the Department of Industrial Management.  Shaw's work has earned her the Xerox Research Chair, and she has served on a Research Panel of the NSF. She has been an editor of several academic journals, including the Journal of Labor Economics, and the Review of Economics and Statistics.

Selected works

References

External links

21st-century American economists
American women economists
Living people
Harvard University alumni
Occidental College alumni
Labor economists
American business theorists
Year of birth missing (living people)
United States Council of Economic Advisers
21st-century American women